Music building may refer to:

Music Building (University of Pittsburgh), a historic building that houses the music department of the University of Pittsburgh
MarAbel B. Frohnmayer Music Building, the home of the School of Music and Dance at the University of Oregon in Eugene, Oregon
Music Building, a building at Exhibition Place on the Toronto shore of Lake Ontario which houses Immersion Studio
The Music Building, a music rehearsal facility in New York City.